Hatton railway station was a railway station in Hatton, Aberdeenshire. It was situated to the south-east of the village and closed in 1932. Like the other stations on the branch, it was designed by Mr Smith, the GNSR architect in 1897.

References

Disused railway stations in Aberdeenshire
Former Great North of Scotland Railway stations
Railway stations in Great Britain opened in 1897
Railway stations in Great Britain closed in 1932
1897 establishments in Scotland
1932 disestablishments in Scotland